German submarine U-1221 was a Type IXC/40 U-boat built for Nazi Germany's Kriegsmarine during World War II.

Design
German Type IXC/40 submarines were slightly larger than the original Type IXCs. U-1221 had a displacement of  when at the surface and  while submerged. She had two shafts and two  propellers.

U-1221 was fitted with six  torpedo tubes (four fitted at the bow and two at the stern), 22 torpedoes, one  SK C/32 naval gun, 180 rounds, and a  SK C/30 as well as a  C/30 anti-aircraft gun. The boat had a complement of forty-eight.

Service history
U-1221 was ordered on 25 August 1941 from Deutsche Werft, AG in Hamburg under the yard number 384. Her keel was laid down on 28 October 1942 and the U-boat was launched the following year on 26 May 1943. She was commissioned into service under the command of Oberleutnant zur See Karl Kölzer (Crew 31) in the 4th U-boat Flotilla on 11 August 1943.

On 20 January 1944, Kölzer handed over command to Oberleutnant zur See Paul Ackermann (Crew XII/39), who took her on her first - and only - patrol in the West Atlantic from 20 August until 28 November 1944.

During an air raid by Eighth Air Force on Kiel, U-1221 was hit by two bombs in the fore-ship on 3 April 1945. The U-boat sank immediately, taking the skeleton crew of 18 with her. Seven of her crew perished, while the rest was rescued through the stern torpedo tubes the next day.

References

Bibliography

World War II submarines of Germany
German Type IX submarines
1943 ships
U-boats commissioned in 1943
U-boats sunk in 1945
U-boats sunk by US aircraft
Maritime incidents in April 1945